In gridiron football, roughing the passer is a foul in which a defensive player makes illegal contact with the quarterback after the latter has thrown a forward pass. The penalty is 10 or 15 yards, depending on the league, and an automatic first down for the offense. Defenders are allowed to contact a player attempting a forward pass while he still has possession of the ball (e.g., a quarterback sack); however, once the ball is released, defenders are not allowed to make contact with the quarterback unless carried to do so by momentum. Judgment over whether contact following release was the result of a violation or momentum is made by the referee on a case-by-case basis.

Roughing the passer can also be called if the defender commits intimidating acts toward the passer, such as picking him up and stuffing him into the ground, or wrestling with him. It can also be called if the player who tackles the passer makes helmet to helmet contact, or lands with the full weight of his body on the passer.

An exception to the roughing rule is where the passer rejoins a play after throwing the ball, such as in an attempt to block, recover a fumble, or tackle a defensive player who has gained possession of the ball. In this case, the passer is treated as any other player and may legally be contacted. Roughing the passer also does not apply to lateral passes or backward passes.

Justification
The NFL makes roughing the passer against the rules in an effort to protect its quarterbacks.

Penalty assessed
Canadian Football League: 15 yards (also enforces at the end of the play) and automatic first down
NFL and NCAA: 15 yards (also enforces at the end of the play) OR half the distance to the goal, whichever is less, and an automatic first down. 
NIRSA: 10 yards (also enforces at the end of the play) and automatic first down

References

Gridiron football penalties